Gu Xiaofei (born 14 March 1989 in Nantong) is a Chinese Paralympic powerlifter. He is a three-time silver medalist at the Summer Paralympics. He is also a five-time medalist, including two gold medals, at the World Para Powerlifting Championships.

He represented China at the Summer Paralympics in 2012, 2016 and 2021 and he won three silver medals: in the men's 82.5 kg event in 2012, in the men's 80 kg event in 2016 and in the men's 80 kg event in 2021.

At the 2017 World Para Powerlifting Championships held in Mexico City, Mexico, he won the silver medal in the men's 80 kg event. Two years later, at the 2019 World Para Powerlifting Championships held in Nur-Sultan, Kazakhstan, he also won the silver medal in the men's 80 kg event. In 2021, he won the gold medal in his event at the 2021 World Para Powerlifting Championships held in Tbilisi, Georgia.

References

External links 
 

1989 births
Living people
Chinese powerlifters
Male powerlifters
Paralympic powerlifters of China
Paralympic silver medalists for China
Paralympic medalists in powerlifting
Powerlifters at the 2012 Summer Paralympics
Powerlifters at the 2016 Summer Paralympics
Powerlifters at the 2020 Summer Paralympics
Medalists at the 2012 Summer Paralympics
Medalists at the 2016 Summer Paralympics
Medalists at the 2020 Summer Paralympics
Sportspeople from Nantong
21st-century Chinese people